Espen Lindqvist is a Norwegian bridge player.

Bridge accomplishments

Awards
 Fishbein Trophy (2) 2014, 2017

Wins

 Buffett Cup (1) 2008
 North American Bridge Championships (7)
Jacoby Open Swiss Teams (3) 2013, 2015, 2016 
 Spingold (2) 2014, 2017 
 Reisinger Board-A-Match Teams (1) 2014 
 Mitchell Open Board-A-Match Teams (1) 2015

Runners-up

 North American Bridge Championships (4)
Jacoby Open Swiss Teams (1) 2009 
 Von Zedtwitz Life Master Pairs (1) 2017 
Vanderbilt (1) 2017
Mitchell Board-a-Match Teams (1) 2016

Notes

External links

Norwegian contract bridge players
Living people
Year of birth missing (living people)